The 2011 Skyrunner World Series was the 10th edition of the global skyrunning competition, Skyrunner World Series, organised by the International Skyrunning Federation from 2002.

Same format of the seasons 2008, 2009 and 2010.

Results
The World Cup has developed in 14 races from May to September.

Men's standings
The champions based on the sum of the best three World Series’ race results and one World Series Trial.

References

External links
 Skyrunner World Series

2011